Tyn Head Court, later known as Wethered Court, is a historic home located east of Dover, Kent County, Delaware. Prior to 1680 under the government of the   Duke of York, Griffth Jones 
and John Glover took up a 650 acre tract called Tyn Head Court. In 1681.
Jones and Glover, now prominent men in the area, were given patents to the
land by William Penn's government. Later, Robert French acquired the Tyn Head tract of 700 acres, and
willed it to his daughter Catherine in 1713. Catherine married John
Shannon and split the tract between their two daughters Mary and Ann.
Ann Shannon married Major John Patton, an officer in the 1st Delaware Regiment during the Revolutionary
War, who was captured by the British in 1780 the Battle of Camden Court House, 
was a major victory for the British in the Southern theater of the American Revolutionary War.
The Patton tract included a frame house, no longer standing.
Mary Shannon married James Svkes, a Lieutenant in Caesar Rodney's
Company, and later a delegate to the Continental Congresses of 1777 and 1778
James Sykes was also a delegate to the State Constitutional Convention.
On the Sykes tract, the present brick, gambrel-roofed house was erected
sometime before 178O. The Sykes tract and house were inherited by their daughter, Mary,
who married John Wethered. Thus, the property became known as Wethered Court.
In 1816 Wethered Court was bought by William Heverin, a shipowner, grain merchant, and farmer. Heverin added a lower brick wing 
to the south
of the main portion of Wethered Court; the wing contained a kitchen with
servants quarters above.
William Heverin sold Wethered Court in 1871. Since that time the
house has been occupied by various farmers and tenants. The south wing
was removed in 1954.

Wethered Court, a three-bay gambrel-roofed structure, is constructed of brick and completely stuccoed.
The front, or west facade is distinguished by a shallow box cornice with simple moulding, and a bevelled water table. 
Three shed-roofed dormers pur
the roof. Minor details include a rectangular light over the entry, and
segmental arch supports over the basement windows.
The rear, or east facade 4 matches the front with the exception of the
absences of a water table and entry over-light. In addition, the roof is
pierced by only two dormers, located over the center and south bays.
The north facade is marked by two windows, assymetrically placed.
The south facade retains evidence of a lower wing, originally flush
with the east facade. Two windows, both on the first floor, remain; the
east window is modern and occupies the position of the portal connection to
the south wing.
The first floor of Tyn Head Court is disposed into two rooms with a
north hall. An open stair occupies the northeast corner, and two interior
doors are located on the south partition wall. Of the original detailing,
a chair rail along the south wall remains.
The east room has been obscured by the addition of modern kitchen
appliances and cabinetry. The west room, however, retains its chair railing
and crown moulding. A corner fireplace, now sealed, is complete with
bracketed mantel and breast paneling; a cupboard also remains in the southwest corner.
The second floor is a mixture of remaining original woodwork and
recently added paneling. It is presently divided into a central hall with
three chambers and a modern bathroom.
The basement is contained by common bond brick foundation walls. To
the south are located two corner fireplaces, which adjoin a supporting
partition wall. The floor remains unfinished.

The main home dates to about 1740, and is a two-story, three bay, stuccoed brick dwelling with a gambrel roof. 

It was added to the National Register of Historic Places in 1973.

References

Houses on the National Register of Historic Places in Delaware
Houses completed in 1740
Houses in Dover, Delaware
National Register of Historic Places in Dover, Delaware